Temotu is an islet of Vaitupu, Tuvalu. Temotu village which has a current population of 52 inhabitants resides on the islet. The average elevation of Temotu Village is 1 meter.

References

Islands of Tuvalu
Vaitupu